Government House refers to the offices of the Prime Minister of Thailand and appointed cabinet ministers. It contains conference rooms and is used for state functions and receptions of foreign guests.

History
King Vajiravudh (Rama VI) commissioned the Italian architect Annibale Rigotti to design the main building in 1923, although construction would remain incomplete as Rigotti returned to Italy after the king's death in 1925. The house was originally called Baan Norasingha. Initially intended as a family residence for one of the king's favorite generals, General Chao Phraya Ram Rakop, the building became the prime minister's office in 1941. Prime Minister Plaek Phibunsongkhram then assigned Italian sculptor and artist Corrado Feroci to complete construction (also working on the building at this point was the architect Ercole Manfredi). The main building is crowned with a golden dome housing a statue of Phra Phrom and its façade resembles that of the Ca' d'Oro Palazzo in Venice.

During the 2008 Thai political crisis, People's Alliance for Democracy (PAD) protesters besieged Government House. After a court order, they had to move, but then attempted to block the government house once more and succeeded. The cabinet temporarily moved to Don Mueang International Airport. The protesters then besieged Don Mueang International Airport soon after that, giving the cabinet no place to work. On 1 December 2008, after protesting for three months, the protesters left Government House as there were constant attacks. Government House was again besieged in December 2013 during the 2013–2014 Thai political crisis.

Thai-Khu-Fah Building

The Thai-Khu-Fah Building is an important building on the Government House grounds. The building is home to the Cabinet of Thailand and the Office of the Prime Minister. The prime minister does not live in this building. The Phitsanulok Mansion nearby is the official residence of the prime minister.

The building has two floors with a neo-Venetian Gothic architecture combined with Byzantine art and one staircase. On the roof there is a small shrine to Phra Phrom. Downstairs are three lounges. The first is the Golden Dome Room on the south side of the building for the prime minister's guests. The second is the Ivory Room which is in front of the Golden Dome Room and adjacent to the right, which is a lounge for official visitors of the prime minister. The third is the Purple Room, which is on the ground floor to the right-hand side of the building. This is a lounge for the visitors of the deputy prime minister and other cabinet ministers. The building has a small conference room for the Board of Committees, chaired by the prime minister. The upper floor of the building houses the prime minister's office, the offices of political officers, and the old cabinet conference room.

Gallery

References

Government buildings in Bangkok
Unregistered ancient monuments in Bangkok
Buildings and structures in Bangkok
Government buildings completed in 1925